Geoffrey Plantagenet may refer to:

 Geoffrey Plantagenet, Count of Anjou (1113–1151), Count of Anjou, father of Henry II of England and the first to be known as Plantagenet
 Geoffrey (archbishop of York) (1151–1212), Archbishop of York, illegitimate son of Henry II
 Geoffrey II, Duke of Brittany (1158–1186), Duke of Brittany, third surviving legitimate son of Henry II